The Bình mai Massacre was a massacre allegedly perpetrated by South Korean forces on 9 October 1966 of 29-168 citizens in Bình Tai village of Bình Định Province in South Vietnam.

Investigation
The South Korean newspaper, The Hankyoreh, investigated war crimes in Vietnam and this massacre had first came to light from a testimony by an officer whom had overseen the killing. Colonel Kim Ki-tae, former commander of the Seventh Company, 2nd Marine Division, testified in The Hankyoreh on 9 October 1966 about the event. Colonel Kim had reported he oversaw the murder of 29 men who were 'probably just farmers' alongside other civilians, and confirmed by the Hankyoreh's onsite investigation of events. South Korean troops set fire to the villagers' homes and shot the villagers who fled the burning buildings. The raid had been ordered as a punitive action by the Division Headquarters as retaliation for the killing of a ROKA Infantry Soryeong (Major) and a ROK Marine Artillery Jungsa (First Sergeant) three days before by sniper fire. The testimony by Colonel Kim had prompted other Korean veterans to testify about mass-killings. The massacre was discussed by the People's Tribunal on War Crimes by South Korean Troops during the Vietnam War in 2018.

See also

Military history of South Korea during the Vietnam War
Phong Nhị and Phong Nhất massacre
Hà My massacre
Mỹ Lai Massacre
Bình Hòa massacre
War Remnants Museum

References

Massacres in Vietnam
Southeast (Vietnam)
Vietnam War crimes by South Korea
Massacres committed by South Korea
1966 in Vietnam
October 1966 events in Asia
Massacres in 1966
Military history of South Korea during the Vietnam War
History of Bình Định province